Fennville is a city in Allegan County in the U.S. state of Michigan.  The population was 1,745 at the 2020 census.

History 

The "official" and widely accepted account of how the city came to be known as Fennville, is that an early white settler by the name of Elam Atwater Fenn built a saw mill in the immediate vicinity of the current community. This led to people referring to the settlement as "Fenn's Mill" which became the name associated with the post office there. Some early documents pluralized "Mill" to render "Fenn's Mills." The first road through what was to be Fennville was built by Harrison Hutchins and James McCormick in 1837.

A fire (possibly related to the Great Chicago Fire or Great Michigan Fire) destroyed the village in October 1871. About that time, the paperwork (timetables and such) for the recently completed Chicago and Michigan Lake Shore Railroad arrived which identified the community's station as "Fennville." This was thought by some at the time (including Hutchins) to have been the result of clerical error. However, Fenn himself recorded that the change in name had been suggested by and mutually agreed upon among certain leaders of the community in conjunction with the establishment of the new railroad station. The post office name was then changed to "Fennville" to match the station's name. The community was officially incorporated as the village of Fennville on February 20, 1889.

A United States atlas from 1895 indicates the town name was in some cases broken into two words, as in "Fenn Ville." Yet another documented variation was "Fennsville" as found in a plat book from 1873. See References below.

Geography

Demographics

2010 census
As of the census of 2010, there were 1,398 people, 505 households, and 346 families residing in the city. The racial makeup of the city was 72.6% White, 1.9% African American, 0.5% Native American, 0.1% Asian, 20.7% from other races, and 4.2% from two or more races. Hispanic or Latino of any race were 39.1% of the population.

There were 505 households, of which 45.9% had children under the age of 18 living with them, 42.2% were married couples living together, 17.8% had a female householder with no husband present, 8.5% had a male householder with no wife present, and 31.5% were non-families. 26.7% of all households were made up of individuals, and 8.7% had someone living alone who was 65 years of age or older. The average household size was 2.77 and the average family size was 3.36.

The median age in the city was 28.7 years. 34.9% of residents were under the age of 18; 8.5% were between the ages of 18 and 24; 28.4% were from 25 to 44; 20.7% were from 45 to 64; and 7.7% were 65 years of age or older. The gender makeup of the city was 50.3% male and 49.7% female.

2000 census
As of the census of 2000, there were 1,459 people, 484 households, and 349 families residing in the city. The racial makeup of the city was 73.27% White, 3.15% African American, 0.75% Native American, 0.34% Asian, 19.81% from other races, and 2.67% from two or more races. Hispanic or Latino of any race were 32.63% of the population.

There were 484 households, out of which 48.8% had children under the age of 18 living with them, 50.4% were married couples living together, 16.1% had a female householder with no husband present, and 27.7% were non-families. 23.3% of all households were made up of individuals, and 8.7% had someone living alone who was 65 years of age or older.  The average household size was 3.01 and the average family size was 3.53.

In the city, the population was spread out, with 38.0% under the age of 18, 10.7% from 18 to 24, 29.8% from 25 to 44, 15.1% from 45 to 64, and 6.4% who were 65 years of age or older.  The median age was 26 years. For every 100 females, there were 98.0 males.  For every 100 females age 18 and over, there were 88.1 males.

The median income for a household in the city was $39,013, and the median income for a family was $40,875. Males had a median income of $32,833 versus $25,556 for females. The per capita income for the city was $16,127.  About 9.7% of families and 12.2% of the population were below the poverty line, including 15.5% of those under age 18 and 9.5% of those age 65 or over.

Education 
The Fennville Public Schools district includes:
 Fennville High School (9-12)
 Fennville Middle School (6-8)
 Fennville Elementary School (K-5)
 Pearl Alternative/Adult Education School (9-12)

The Discovery Elementary School, a chartered public school academy located in Fennville, closed at the end of the 2009 school year.

Tourism

Goose Festival
Each October since 1984, Fennville has held an annual local event known as the Goose Festival. Fennville's Goose Festival promotes the abundance of area game and wildlife, with a special emphasis on thousands of Canada geese as they pass through the nearby Todd Farm Unit of the Allegan State Game Area during their seasonal migration. One impetus for creating the festival was to encourage passenger train visitation via Amtrak on the railway that runs through Fennville. Tens of thousands of people flock to the small town each year to enjoy the various activities and attractions planned and managed by the volunteer-based Goose Festival organization that operates the Goose Festival.

Wine
Also playing a role in Fennville's appeal as a tourist destination, the city and surrounding region is an American Viticultural Area, the Fennville AVA, known for the production of Michigan wine.

Notable people
 Patricia L. Birkholz - Michigan State Senator
 Edward Hutchinson - United States Representative for the 4th Congressional District of Michigan 1963 – 1977

References

External links

City of Fennville
Fennville History 

Cities in Allegan County, Michigan
1837 establishments in Michigan
Populated places established in 1837